"I Was Kaiser Bill's Batman" was a hit single in 1967 composed by British songwriters Roger Cook and Roger Greenaway. It was a novelty record, performed mostly by whistling. The name Whistling Jack Smith, credited on the most commercially successful recording, was a play on the name of the baritone singer of the 1920s, 1930s and 1940s, Whispering Jack Smith.

Production
The tune was written by Greenaway and Cook and was originally titled "Too Much Birdseed".   It was recorded as a single for Deram Records by record producer Noel Walker, using studio musicians together with the Mike Sammes Singers.  The whistling on the record was, according to most sources, by John O'Neill, a trumpeter and singer with the Mike Sammes Singers who was known for his whistling skill, though other sources credit Noel Walker.  The song is noted for its false ending: after the last chorus, a male voice shouts "Oi" (on the album version) and "Hey" (on the single version), and the tune starts up again with the repeated chorus, then fades out.

Performances
Credited to Whistling Jack Smith, the record rose up the UK singles chart. When it was featured on Top of the Pops, actor Coby Wells was used to mime the whistling, and later toured as the public face of Whistling Jack Smith. Wells' real name was Billy Moeller, a brother of Tommy Moeller, lead vocalist, guitarist, and pianist with Unit 4 + 2.  The recording reached #5 on the UK singles chart in March 1967, staying in the chart for 12 weeks, and peaked at #20 on the Billboard Hot 100 in the U.S.

Pat Boone recorded a whistling version of the song in 1967.  A vocal version of the song, as "Ich war der Putzer vom Kaiser", was recorded in German by Die Travellers, in the late 1960s.  The German lyrics were credited to Fred Oldörp, a member of the group.  The lyrics concern the batman, or Putzer ("cleaner") of the Kaiser, who evades combat because of his position.  It has been suggested that the words derive from a First World War marching song, but that is unconfirmed.

Charts

References

Further reading
 (Open Library loan available)

External links

 

1967 singles
Deram Records singles
Songs written by Roger Cook (songwriter)
Songs written by Roger Greenaway
1967 songs
Novelty songs